Daniel Patrick Harrington Sr. (February 6, 1901 – September 2, 1965) was a Canadian actor.

Biography
Born Daniel Patrick Harrington in Montreal, Quebec, he made his Broadway debut in Panama Hattie in 1940. Additional Broadway credits included the patriotic revue Star and Garter (1942), The Front Page (1946), Call Me Madam (1950) and Sunday in New York (1961). He also appeared on the early television series A Couple of Joes (1949) and The Wonderful John Acton (1953).

He was the father of actor Pat Harrington Jr.

External links

1901 births
1965 deaths
Canadian male stage actors
Canadian male television actors
Male actors from Montreal
20th-century Canadian male actors
Canadian expatriate male actors in the United States